Boleszyce is a part of Szczecin, Poland, situated on the right bank of the Oder, east of Stare Miasto, and south of Dąbie.

Neighbourhoods of Szczecin